Luis Manuel Castro Cáceres (born 27 September 1995) is a Uruguayan professional footballer who plays as a right winger for Liga MX club Juárez.

Career
Castro's career started in his homeland with Montevideo Wanderers, manager Alfredo Arias promoted the midfielder into his first-team squad during the 2014–15 Uruguayan Primera División season. Having been an unused substitute for matches with El Tanque Sisley, Rampla Juniors and Tacuarembó, Castro made his first professional appearance in a 1–0 loss away to Sud América on 6 December 2014. That was his sole appearance that season, with just two more coming in 2015–16. Castro featured fifteen times in the next campaign, whilst scoring his first three senior goals; including his opener over Nacional in September 2016.

In total, Castro appeared in eighty-seven matches for Montevideo Wanderers across five years, a spell in which he netted seventeen goals; notably eleven of which came in 2018, which was his last season with the club. On 4 January 2019, Castro joined Argentine Primera División side Estudiantes; signing a three-year contract. After debuting in a home loss to Vélez Sarsfield on 28 January, he netted his first goal on 18 February against Argentinos Juniors. Further goals versus Talleres and, in the Copa Argentina, Sarmiento occurred across thirty total appearances in his first twelve months with Estudiantes.

Midway through Castro's second season with Estudiantes he joined Major League Soccer's Atlanta United on a six-month loan, with an option for the club to extend the deal for the rest of the season. He made his debut in the CONCACAF Champions League on 11 March as Atlanta lost 3–0 at the Estadio Azteca to América. The club, during the season's delay due to the COVID-19 pandemic, exercised their loan extension option on 29 June. After three appearances in the MLS is Back Tournament, Castro made his regular season bow in a win over Orlando City on 29 August. His loan ended on 24 November, after the winger had appeared eleven times; though just three were as a starter.

Career statistics
.

Notes

References

External links
 
 
 
 

1995 births
Living people
People from Durazno
Uruguayan footballers
Association football midfielders
Uruguayan expatriate footballers
Montevideo Wanderers F.C. players
Estudiantes de La Plata footballers
Atlanta United FC players
Uruguayan Primera División players
Argentine Primera División players
Major League Soccer players
Expatriate footballers in Argentina
Expatriate soccer players in the United States
Uruguayan expatriate sportspeople in Argentina
Uruguayan expatriate sportspeople in the United States